Max Schöne (January 20, 1880 – January 16, 1961) was a German swimmer who competed in the 1900 Summer Olympics. He was born in Berlin. As a member of the German swimming team he won the gold medal at the Paris 1900 edition.

External links
 
 Max Schöne's profile at databaseOlympics

1880 births
1961 deaths
Swimmers from Berlin
German male freestyle swimmers
Olympic swimmers of Germany
Swimmers at the 1900 Summer Olympics
Olympic gold medalists for Germany
Medalists at the 1900 Summer Olympics
Olympic gold medalists in swimming
Place of birth missing
Place of death missing